was a Japanese rower. He competed in the men's coxed four event at the 1932 Summer Olympics.

References

External links

Year of birth missing
Possibly living people
Japanese male rowers
Olympic rowers of Japan
Rowers at the 1932 Summer Olympics
Place of birth missing